The Malaysia women's national under-18 volleyball team represents Malaysia in women's under-18 volleyball events. It is controlled and managed by the Malaysia Volleyball Association (MVA) that is a member of Asian volleyball body Asian Volleyball Confederation (AVC) and the international volleyball body government the Fédération Internationale de Volleyball (FIVB).

Team

Coaching staff

Current squad
The following 18 players were called up for the 2018 Asian Girls' U17 Volleyball Championship in Nakhon Pathom, Thailand.

Competition history

Youth Olympic Games
  2010 – Did not qualify

World Championship
 1989 – Did not qualify
 1991 – Did not qualify
 1993 – Did not qualify
 1995 – Did not qualify
 1997 – Did not qualify
 1999 – Did not enter
 2001 – Did not qualify
 2003 – Did not enter
 2005 – Did not enter
 2007 – Did not enter
 2009 – Did not enter
 2011 – Did not qualify
 2013 – Did not enter
 2015 – Did not enter
 2017 – Did not enter
 2019 – Did not qualify

Asian Championship
 1997 – 6th
 1999 – Did not enter
 2001 – 7th
 2003 – Did not enter
 2005 – Did not enter
 2007 – Did not enter
 2008 – Did not enter
 2010 – 8th
 2012 – Did not enter
 2014 – Did not enter
 2017 – Did not enter
 2018 – 11th

External links
Official fanpage

volleyball
Women's volleyball in Malaysia
National women's under-18 volleyball teams